Oskar Becker (18 June 1839 in Odessa – 16 July 1868 in Alexandria) was a German political fanatic, known for his attempted assassination of William I of Prussia.

Biography
In 1859 he enrolled at Leipzig University, and in 1861, at Baden-Baden, endeavored to kill king William I of Prussia by firing two shots from a pistol, at a distance of three paces. However, the monarch suffered only a slight injury of the neck. The assailant, in a letter found upon him, stated as his motive the conviction that William was unapt of the task of uniting Germany. The assailant was sentenced to twenty years' imprisonment, but was pardoned by the Badish sovereign on William's plea, and released in 1866, with the stipulation that he should leave the German Confederation forever. He lived in Chicago for some time, and subsequently went to Alexandria, Egypt, where he died.

Becker was an uncle of artist Paula Modersohn-Becker. William later became the first emperor of the German Empire.

Notes

References

External links

1839 births
1868 deaths
German activists